Claytonia rosea, commonly called western springbeauty or Madrean springbeauty, is a diminutive perennial herb with long-lived, globose tuberous roots, reddish to green, long-tapered basal leaves, petiolate, cauline leaves, and light pink to magenta flowers. It is found in dry meadows in forests of ponderosa and Chihuahuan pines, and moist ledges of mountain slopes of the Beaver Dam Mountains of Utah, Colorado Front Range, and Sierra Madre Occidental (including the Chiricahua Mountains), south and east to the Sierra Maderas del Carmen of Coahuila.

References

rosea
Flora of Arizona
Flora of Colorado
Flora of Montana
Flora of New Mexico
Flora of Utah
Flora of Wyoming
Flora of Coahuila